Roy Orville Williams (April 30, 1937 - September 6, 2017) is a former American football defensive tackle who played one season with the San Francisco 49ers of the National Football League. He was drafted by the Detroit Lions in the second round of the 1963 NFL Draft. He was also drafted by the San Diego Chargers in the fourth round of the 1963 AFL Draft. Williams played college football at the University of the Pacific and attended Pasco High School in Pasco, Washington.

Williams died on September 6, 2017.

References

External links
Just Sports Stats

1937 births
2017 deaths
Players of American football from Minnesota
American football defensive tackles
Pacific Tigers football players
San Francisco 49ers players
People from Moorhead, Minnesota